Maojini Adob (English: Cats Technique) is a 2007 Bodo Martial arts film directed by Chabin Wary and produced by Tai-Chi Manchu Kung-Fu Academy Film Presents from Bijni. It stars Ronen Basumatary and Silbia Basumatary in leading roles. Mainao Basumatary, Ringkhang Goyary, Derhasath Goyary, Uttam Basumatary and Ajit Basumatary played supporting roles in the film.

Plot
The film is set in Chirang district.

Cast
 Ronen Basumatary as Khwmta
 Silbia Basumatary as Mijing
 Derhasath Goyary as Lokra
 Ringkhang Goyary as Phwilao
 Mainao Basumatary as Mainao

Soundtrack
The music of the film is scored by Sanjib Basumatary, while the lyrics are written by Purnima Basumatary.

See also
 Bodo films

References

2007 films
Indian martial arts films
2007 martial arts films